INS Karanj may refer to the following vessels of the Indian Navy:

 , a  launched in 1968 and decommissioned in 2003
 , a  that was launched in 2018

Indian Navy ship names